Anne-Aymone Marie Josèphe Christiane Giscard d'Estaing (née Sauvage de Brantes; born 10 April 1933) is the widow of former President of France Valéry Giscard d'Estaing.

Biography
She is a daughter of François Marie Joseph Abel Henri Sauvage, Count de Brantes, and his wife, Princess Aymone Marie Sylvie Renée Françoise de Faucigny-Lucinge et Coligny, a great-great-granddaughter of Charles Ferdinand, duc de Berry by his mistress Amy Brown. She grew up at the Château de Fresne in Touraine.

Her father died in Mauthausen-Gusen concentration camp on 8 May 1944. 

Anne-Aymone is a great-niece of the Cuban-born French designer and architect José Emilio Terry y Dorticos and the aunt of Roger Marie Joseph Henri Sauvage de Brantes, the present Marquis de Brantes. Through her mother she is a great-great-granddaughter of Cuban business magnate Tomás Terry y Adán.   

Her great-grandfather was Henri Schneider, himself the son of Eugène Schneider, founder of what would become the international syndicate, Schneider Group. 

On 17 December 1952, she married Valery Giscard d'Estaing. The couple lived in her family home for the early years of their marriage, before settling at the rue Bénouville in the 16th arrondissement of Paris.

The couple had four children: two sons, Henri and Louis, and two daughters, Valérie-Anne and Jacinte.

As First Lady of France, Anne-Aymone set up the Fondation pour l’Enfance in 1977 to raise awareness of child abuse.

In later years, the couple divided their time between Paris and Authon, Loir-et-Cher: Valery died in December 2020 and is buried in Authon. 

In December 2022, Anne-Aymone Giscard d'Estaing put up some of her and her late husband's art and furniture for sale at Hotel Drouot as she planned to move to a smaller Paris home.

Ancestry

References

1933 births
Living people
Politicians from Paris
Spouses of French presidents
École du Louvre alumni
Valéry Giscard d'Estaing